Norman Alfred Lesser  (16 March 1902 – 12 February 1985) was an Anglican bishop and Archbishop of New Zealand from 1961 to 1971. He was the Bishop of Waiapu from 1947 to 1971.

Education and early ministry

He was educated at the Liverpool Collegiate Institution and Fitzwilliam College, Cambridge. He began his ecclesiastical career with a curacy at St Simon and St Jude, Anfield, Liverpool. He then held similar posts at  Holy Trinity, Formby and Liverpool Cathedral. In 1931 he became Vicar  of St John, Barrow-in-Furness. From 1931 to 1939 he was Rector  and Sub-Dean of Nairobi Cathedral and from then until his elevation to the  Waiapu See its Provost.

Episcopal ministry
Lesser succeeded Archbishop Reginald Herbert Owen as Primate of the Anglican Church of New Zealand on his death in 1961. Norman Lesser Drive in Auckland is named after him.

In the 1971 Queen's Birthday Honours, Lesser was appointed a Companion of the Order of St Michael and St George, for services as Primate and Archbishop of New Zealand.

References

External links
Lesser's Papers in the Anglican Church Archive Collection in the John Kinder Theological Library
Lesser's Papers in The National Archives

 

1902 births
1985 deaths
People educated at Liverpool Collegiate Institution
Alumni of Fitzwilliam College, Cambridge
Provosts of the Anglican Church in Aotearoa, New Zealand and Polynesia
20th-century Anglican archbishops in New Zealand
Primates of New Zealand
Anglican bishops of Waiapu
New Zealand Companions of the Order of St Michael and St George